Mucheettukalikkarante Makal is a 1975 Indian Malayalam film based on Vaikom Muhammad Basheer's story of the same name. The film is directed by Thoppil Bhasi and produced by S. K. Nair. It stars Rani Chandra, Bahadoor, KPAC Lalitha, Adoor Bhasi, Manavalan Joseph and Alummoodan in the lead roles. The film has musical score by G. Devarajan.

Cast
 
Rani Chandra as Sainaba
M. G. Soman as Priest
KPAC Lalitha as Kochu Thresia
Adoor Bhasi as Ponkurishu Thoma
Manavalan Joseph 
Alummoodan as Aanavari Raman Nair
Bahadoor as Mandan Muthappa
Bobby Kottarakkara 
Chandraji as Ottakannan Pokker
Krishnamma
Kunchan as Police
Kuthiravattam Pappu as Kochu Thirumeni
Paravoor Bharathan as Kaduva Mathan
Prathapachandran as Police
Oduvil Unnikrishanan as Police
Thoppil Bhasi as Ettukali Mammoonj
Muthukulam Raghavan Pilla as Palunkan
Kollam GK Pilla

Soundtrack
The music was composed by G. Devarajan and the lyrics were written by Vayalar.

References

External links
 

1975 films
1970s Malayalam-language films
Films with screenplays by Thoppil Bhasi
Films directed by Thoppil Bhasi